The Children's Party at the Palace was an event organised by Peter Orton of Hit Entertainment and David Johnstone of DJI consult, held in the Garden at Buckingham Palace on 25 June 2006 in honour of the 80th birthday of Queen Elizabeth II. The event, which had the theme of British children's literature, was attended by 2,000 children and 1,000 adults who were chosen through a national ballot. On arrival, all guests received a purple hamper with snacks put together by Jamie Oliver.

For the occasion, the palace grounds were transformed into scenes from children's books, including places like the Hundred Acre Wood, with 80 costumed characters and a model of the BFG sitting at a huge piano. The grounds also had an authors' corner, where authors like J. K. Rowling, Philip Pullman, Eric Hill and Raymond Briggs read from their books and signed autographs.

The Queen's Handbag
The main attraction of the party was a pantomime-style play called The Queen's Handbag, written by children's author and playwright David Wood and directed by Trevor Nunn, which was performed on a stage resembling Buckingham Palace and broadcast live on both BBC One and the CBBC Channel.

In the play, the villains of children's literature are angry to find out none of them have been invited to the party, so they decide to ruin the party for the goodies too. After multiple failed attempts, one of them manages to steal the Queen's handbag. Without its contents (her reading glasses) the Queen won't be able to deliver her closing speech. Multiple scenes of the play, including a scene starring Harry Potter and his friends, were pre-recorded and played on large video screens.

The play ended with a rendition of "Supercalifragilisticexpialidocious" by the entire cast, led by the London company of the musical Mary Poppins. Throughout the programme, the audience was kept up to date about the status of the missing handbag with reports from both BBC News and Crimewatch. The use of a fake newsflash caused complaints to be made to the BBC.

Cast

References

British monarchy
Parties
2006 in London
Buckingham Palace